Librovitschiceras is a genus of nautilids, in the subclass Nautiloidea, with a triangular cross section, included in the family Aipoceratidae. Its exact relationship with other aipoceratids is uncertain. Whorls are in contact, the siphuncle is slightly removed from the venter, which has a deep sinus.

Librovitschiceras lived during the Late Carboniferous in what is now western Russia. Aipoceras and Asymptoceras are possibly related.

References

 Bernhard Kummel, 1964.  Nautiloidea - Nauilida; Treatise on Invertebrate Paleontology, Part K. Geological Society of America. 
 Fossilworks, Librovitschiceras

Prehistoric nautiloid genera